Bread & Circuses is a 1997 album by Colosseum.

Track listing
"Watching Your Every Move" (Heckstall-Smith, Clempson, Hiseman) – 4:03
"Bread & Circuses" (Clempson, Hiseman)– 3:37
"Wherever I Go" (Greenslade) – 4:15
"High Time" (Clempson, Bell) – 4:06
"Big Deal" (Heckstall-Smith, Brown) – 5:11
"The Playground" (Greenslade) – 5:07
"No Pleasin'" (Greenslade) – 5:02
"I Could Tell You Tales" (Greenslade, Heckstall-Smith, Brown) – 5:04
"Storms Behind the Breeze" (Greenslade) – 4:42
"The One That Got Away" – 4:15
"The Other Side of the Sky" (Greenslade) – 4:42

Personnel
Colosseum
Chris Farlowe - lead vocals (all but 6)
Dick Heckstall-Smith - saxophones
Dave "Clem" Clempson - guitar, backing vocals
Dave Greenslade - synthesizer, piano, Hammond organ
Mark Clarke - bass, backing and lead (6) vocals
Jon Hiseman - drums, cymbals

See also
 Bread and Circuses (disambiguation)

1997 albums
Colosseum (band) albums